Jason James Tucker (born 3 February 1973) is an English former professional footballer who played in the Football League as a midfielder.

External links
Profile at ENFA

1973 births
Living people
Footballers from Isleworth
English footballers
Association football midfielders
Aldershot F.C. players
Enfield F.C. players
Aldershot Town F.C. players
Aylesbury United F.C. players
Bishop's Stortford F.C. players
Hayes F.C. players
Yeading F.C. players
Hanwell Town F.C. players
English Football League players